Walter William Brown (31 May 1925 – 15 April 2011 in Botany, New South Wales) was an Australian sprint canoeist who competed in the late 1950s. He won a bronze medal in the K-2 10000 m event at the 1956 Summer Olympics in Melbourne, with his kayak partner Dennis Green.

References
Walter Brown's profile at Sports Reference.com
Walter Brown's obituary

1925 births
2011 deaths
Australian male canoeists
Canoeists at the 1956 Summer Olympics
Olympic canoeists of Australia
Olympic bronze medalists for Australia
Olympic medalists in canoeing
Medalists at the 1956 Summer Olympics
20th-century Australian people